Kanad is a town and a nagar parishad in Agar Malwa district in the Indian state of Madhya Pradesh. It comes under Kanad Parishad. It belongs to Ujjain Division. It is situated along the Agar–Sarangpur SH-41 highway. It is located  towards east from the district headquarters of Agar Malwa,  from Ujjain,  from the state capital of Bhopal.

The telephone code is 07362.

Geography

Kanad is surrounded by Agar Tehsil towards the west, Nalkheda Tehsil towards the east, Susner Tehsil and Dag Tehsil towards the north.
Indore (125 km), Ujjain (84 km), Shajapur (32 km), Maksi (57 km) Dewas (92 km) Agar (18 km) sarangpur (32km) are the nearby cities to Kanad.
Other major cities located near to Kanad include Gwalior (409 km), Kota (210 km), Bhopal (189 km), Guna (192 km).

Climate
Three distinct seasons are observed: summer, monsoon and winter.

Summers start in mid-March and can be extremely hot in April and May. The daytime temperatures can touch  on more than one occasion. Average summer temperatures may go as high as  but humidity is very low.

Winters are moderate and usually dry. Lower temperatures can go as low as - on some nights. Usually the temperature ranges between 8 and 26 °C during winters.

Rains are due to southwest monsoons. The typical monsoon season goes from 15 June till mid-September, contributing 32–35 inches of annual rains. About 95% of rains occur during monsoon season.

Kanad gets moderate rainfall of  during July–September due to the southwest monsoon.

Demographics
 India census, Kanad had a population of 8,650. Males constitute 52% of the population and females 48%. Kanad has an average literacy rate of 61%, higher than the national average of 59.5%. Male literacy is 73%, and female literacy is 48%. In Kanad, 17% of the population is under 6 years of age.

Hindi is the official language here while Malwi is regional language.

Tourism
The town contains a famous temple, Mata Bijasan Mandir which is the main attraction of people.
There are also some notable temples like Shri Hinglaj devi math (Thakur seri), Shri Bhooteshwar Mahadev Mandir (khati mohalla), Shri Devnarayan Mandir (Shivgarh), Shri Hanuman Mandir (Hanuman Bawdi) which are connected the town.

Badi Mata Mandir in Pacheti (15 km in south), Kamal Kalika Mata Mandir in Kalmoi (10 km in south), Shri Mangleshwar Mahadev Mandir in Shivtoda (Chowma) (7 km in east) are the famous tourism attraction which are nearer to the town.

Festivals
All national festivals such as Holi, Gangaur, Teej, Rangpanchmi, Raksha Bandhan, Krishna Janmashtami, Mahavir jayanthi, Ganesh Utsav, Ramzan, Eid, Navratri, Durga puja, Dussehra, Bakri Eid, Gudi Padwa, Deepawali, Bhaidooj, Moharram, Christmas, Nagpanchami, Mahashivratri, Hanuman Jayanthi, Parshuram Jayanthi are celebrated.

Colleges near Kanad

Nehru Government Post Graduate College, Agar Malwa(M.P.)(18 km in West)

Nearest railway stations
Maksi in South (60) km
Shajapur in South (38 km)
Bercha in East (50 km)
Ujjain in South (93 km)
Indore in South (134K km)
Bhopal in East (191 km)

Nearest airport

Devi Aahilya Bai Holkar Airport, Indore in South (143 km)

References

Cities and towns in Shajapur district
Shajapur